"Timshel" is an episode of Hell on Wheels.

Timshel may also refer to:
Timshel (company), a company associated with the Hillary Clinton 2016 presidential campaign
"Timshel", a song by Mumford & Sons from Sigh No More
"Timshel", a comic by Lark Pien

People with the given name
Timshel Matheny, member of Roman Candle

See also
 East of Eden (novel)